Yosl Bergner (‎; 13 October 1920 – 18 January 2017), also known as Josl, was an Israeli painter. He was born in Vienna, Austria, grew up in Warsaw, Poland, lived in Melbourne, Australia from 1937 until 1948, when he moved to Israel.

Biography
Yosl Bergner was born in Vienna, Austria, in 1920 and grew up in Warsaw, Poland.

With rampant anti-Semitism in Europe, the Freeland League for Jewish Territorial Colonization was formed in the United States in July 1935, to search for a potential Jewish homeland. As history showed, the plans went nowhere. But for a time, the Australian idea was at least worth considering. Bergner's father, Melech Ravitch, became involved in a serious investigation of the Kimberley Plan.

In this way the Bergner family moved to Australia. Yosl emigrated to Australia in 1937 and studied in the National Gallery School in Melbourne until the outbreak of World War II. He served for four and a half years in the Australian Army, and later continued his studies at the Art School.

In Melbourne from 1937–48, Bergner befriended many of the local artists who now epitomize modern Australian art: Sidney Nolan, Albert Tucker, John Perceval and Arthur Boyd. Adrian Lawlor moved with his wife to a cottage at Warrandyte, an outer suburb of Melbourne, where they lived for 30 years. Bergner was a frequent visitor at their Warrandyte home. All the men socialized together. Bergner encouraged them to go beyond their traditional landscape style and introduced a more radical concern for working families, thus having an important impact on Australian art.

Bergner may not have been prepared for the plight of many struggling Australians. Yet he felt a strong connection between the suffering of people everywhere, whether they were the Jews that he remembered from Europe, landless blacks in the heart of Australia or hungry children in inner urban Melbourne.

He left Australia in 1948 and after two years of traveling and exhibiting in Paris, Montreal and New York City, he settled in Israel. He lived in Safed until moving to Tel Aviv in 1957 with his wife, the artist Audrey Bergner.

Works
Bergner designed scenery and costumes for the Yiddish and Hebrew theatres, particularly for the plays of Nisim Aloni, and has illustrated many books.
The acme of Bergner's paintings is his allegorical works; he uses kitchen tools such as squashed pots, oil lamps, wrecks and cracked jugs and he anthropomorphizes them. These old instruments symbolize distorted and poor world of wars, secrets and darkness. one of his student was Nurit Shany, a painter and a multidisciplinary Israeli artist.

Awards
 In 1956, Bergner was a co-recipient of the Dizengoff Prize for painting.
 In 1980, he was awarded the Israel Prize for painting.

See also
List of Israel Prize recipients

References

Further reading

 Webberley, Helen "How Australian was Yosl Bergner?", Limmud Oz Conference, Sydney, 2007.

External links

 Yosl Bergner at The Jewish Museum (New York)
 Yosl Bergner at the Engel Gallery
 The Dan Gallery has been the official and exclusive representative of the artist Yosl Bergner 
 Yosl Bergner: Artworks at the National Gallery of Victoria (59)

1920 births
2017 deaths
Australian emigrants to Israel
Austrian emigrants to Poland
20th-century Austrian Jews
21st-century Austrian Jews
Bundists
Jewish socialists
Israel Prize in painting recipients
Israeli painters
National Gallery of Victoria Art School alumni
Artists from Warsaw
Polish emigrants to Australia
Australian Army personnel of World War II